Lukas Klünter (born 26 May 1996) is a German professional footballer who plays as a midfielder or defender for  club Arminia Bielefeld.

Club career
Klünter broke into Köln's senior team during the 2016–17 season. In May 2017, he scored his first professional goal for Köln in a 2–2 draw with Bayer Leverkusen. After the team's relegation following the 2017/18 season it was announced that Klünter would transfer to Hertha BSC in the summer. He played for both the first team and the reserve team during the 2018–19 season.

On 5 August 2022, Klünter signed with Arminia Bielefeld.

International career
Klünter is a youth international for Germany.

Career statistics

Honours
Germany
UEFA European Under-21 Championship: 2017

References

1996 births
Living people
People from Erftstadt
People from Euskirchen
Sportspeople from Cologne (region)
German footballers
Footballers from North Rhine-Westphalia
Association football midfielders
Association football defenders
Bundesliga players
Regionalliga players
Hertha BSC players
Arminia Bielefeld players
1. FC Köln players
1. FC Köln II players
Hertha BSC II players
Germany under-21 international footballers
Germany youth international footballers